Pomacea interrupta is a species of freshwater snail with a gill and an operculum, an aquatic gastropod mollusk in the family Ampullariidae, the apple snails.

Distribution 
This species occurs in Brazil.

References 

interrupta
Gastropods described in 1909